Sonya (pronounced Sawn•ya) is a small hamlet in Durham Region and the City of Kawartha Lakes in Ontario, Canada.  It is located 3 km north of Seagrave on Simcoe Street, also known as Regional Road 2.

A recently constructed sub-division has expanded the hamlet from about 15 houses to more than 30.  At one time it had a railroad station, as part of the Whitby, Port Perry, and Lindsay Railroad, a post office, a blacksmith shop, and a general store.  The railroad closed in the 1940s and the general store was destroyed by fire in the 1950s. The railroad trackbed is still visible just west of the hamlet where it crossed the concession road, and the station, now gone, was located just north of the road.

The former Knox Presbyterian Church, built in 1893, is now a private residence, after closing in the 1980s.

The village park land is now surrounded by the new subdivision and was once home to the Sonya Sleigh Riders baseball team.

Demographics 

References

External links
Sonya at Geographical Names of Canada

Communities in the Regional Municipality of Durham
Communities in Kawartha Lakes